The House of Busaid, also known as Al Said dynasty, is the current ruling royal house of the Oman, and former ruling royal house of the Omani Empire (from 1744 to 1856), Sultanate of Muscat and Oman (1856 to 1970) and the Sultanate of Zanzibar (1856 to 1964). It was founded by Ahmad bin Said al-Busaidi, ruler of Oman and its east African territories at the time. 

The Busaid dynasty traces its roots to the tribes of Azd through a patrilineal ancestor, al-'Atik  al-Asad b. Imran, who settled in Dibba (Dabá), hence the band was also known as the "Azd of Daba".
Like other Qahtani, the Azd originally hailed from Yemen and migrated north after the destruction of the Marib Dam.

With the rise of Islam, the Azd established themselves into a leading force in the ensuing Muslim conquests and later in the realms of the Umayyad Caliphate through the celebrated general Al Muhallab ibn Abi Suffrah (Abu Said), the progenitor of the Busaid tribe. Significantly, it is with the Azd that most early sections of pre-Islamic universal chronicles of Arabs begin.

Rise to power
Ahmad bin Said Al Busaidi, a shrewd military tactician, was the governor of Sohar when a Persian fleet attacked the town. He held out for nine months, finally forcing the Persian commander of Nader Shah's army to come to terms and leave the country altogether within a few years. He was elected imam in 1744, marking the last time Oman was occupied by foreign parties and the beginning of a new unified state. It was also the start of a dynasty that has lasted to the present day, making it one of the oldest surviving royal dynasties in Arabia and the first to gain independence.

His descendants did not take the religious title of Imam, but Sayyid, an honorific title held by members of the royal family to this day, thus relinquishing all pretense of spiritual authority while fostering Muslim scholars and promoting Islamic scholarship.

Trade flourished during Ahmed's thirty-nine-year reign and the Omani navy developed into a formidable force in the Indian Ocean second only to Great Britain and capable of purging Persians forces from the entire region and protecting Ottoman vessels in the Gulf of Oman, Indian Ocean and the Pirate Coast of Trucial Oman.

When he died in 1778, the ulema replaced Ahmed with his son, Said bin Ahmed, who was very religious but shrank from administrative duties. Since the tenets of Ibadhism allowed for the division of duties between leaders along religious, administrative and military lines, he removed himself to Rustaq until his death in 1811.

His son Hamad bin Said moved the capital from the interior city of Rustaq to the coastal Muscat in 1783 and took the title of sultan, implying purely coercive power. He was a capable leader for eight years and facilitated reform policy in the initial stages of the transition but died suddenly in 1792 of smallpox.

Alliance with the British Empire
Sultan bin Ahmed assumed control of the government after the death of his nephew and strengthened the already powerful fleet by adding numerous gunships and sleek cargo vessels. He also needed a strong ally to help him regain control of Mombasa from the Mazrui clan, fight off the movement spreading from what is now Saudi Arabia and to keep the Qasimi tribes from the Persian city of Lingeh out of Oman. He found this able ally in Great Britain, who by this time was a powerful maritime nation with an empire expanding all over the world. In the late 18th century, the second British Empire was at war with France and knew that the French emperor, Napoleon Bonaparte, was planning to march through Persia and capture Muscat on his way to invade India. In 1798 Britain and Oman agreed a Treaty of Commerce and Navigation.

Sultan bin Ahmed pledged himself to British interests in India, and his territories became out of bounds to the French. He allowed the British East India Company to establish the first trading station in the Persian Gulf, and a British consul was posted to Muscat. As well as defeating Bonaparte, the British had another motive for the treaty with Oman: they wanted to put pressure on the sultan to end slavery, which had been declared illegal in England in 1772. At this time, the trade from Africa to Oman was still buoyant, and Zanzibar's position as an important trade centre was bolstered further when the supply of ivory from Mozambique to India collapsed because of excessive Portuguese export duties. The traders simply shipped their ivory through Zanzibar instead. Omani warships were in constant skirmishes up and down the gulf, which kept the sultan preoccupied. It was in the course of one of his sorties during an incursion abroad a ship in the Persian Gulf in 1804 that Sultan Sayyid was shot in the head by a stray bullet, he was buried in Lingeh.

Said bin Sultan (Said the Great)

The death of Sultan bin Ahmed sent the country into a state of shock and inter-family rivalries. Dissident tribes and outside agitators who all conspired to make the role of supreme commander a speculative proposition at best. Sultan's eldest son Said was merely thirteen, too young to take the reins of his country, "so the elders called upon another nephew Badr bin Saif to act as regent in the boy's behalf until he came of age."

The decision to enlist Badr was unfortunately a bad one, as he had political aspirations of his own. The royal house turned against him but he refused to relinquish his hold of power without a struggle. Said, now sixteen, conspired to have him assassinated. On a pretext to inspect the munitions at Nakhal Fort, Badr went to Barka and met Said at Bait al Nu'man castle. There he was killed in a dramatic duel to the death with daggers. A wounded Badr escaped but was finished off by Said's horsemen. Said immediately assumed the government and held it until his death fifty-two years later. He announced to the British that he had assumed power, but they were slow to respond. They acknowledged the young monarch a year later when they realized that their fortunes were best served by courting him.

During the reign of the renowned Sultan Said bin Sultan, the progenitor of the Busaidi dynasty, he took Oman to its zenith as a commercial and political maritime power: extending its borders to include Mombasa and parts of the east African coast, Zanzibar, Pemba Island, Mafia Island, Lamu Archipelago, Cape Delgado (northern border of the current Mozambique), Bandar-Abbas and the southern Iranian coast, Gwadar province of Balochistan (bought by Pakistan in 1958) and, for a short time Bahrain. He was counted among the best leaders as his reputation spread to the crown heads of Europe and became known as Said the Great. Few Arab leaders of any time were as well known and respected as Sheikh Said. Trade flourished and Muscat became a key market for the Persian Gulf. The celebrated explorer Richard Francis Burton called him "as shrewd, liberal and enlightened a prince as Arabia has ever produced," and an Italian physician who served him for a time said: "His constant love of justice, and distinguished clemency, the effects of which are felt, not only by his own subjects, but even by his domestic slaves."

In 1832, he made the island of Zanzibar his second capital and set about establishing what is present-day Stone Town. A merchant prince and capable warrior, he spent much of his time at sea depending on mercantile and maritime resources for his power in both Oman and Zanzibar. Recognizing the suitability of Zanzibar climate and soil, he initiated large scale cultivation of cloves (an essential meat preservative in Europe prior to the advent of refrigeration) and soon after sought slaves as cheap labor to plant and harvest the biennial crop. He is also noted for revitalizing the production of rice and sugar cane as well as the export of ivory and gum copal. Such was his enterprise and commercial skill that it could probably be said that he established the first international market on the island of Zanzibar; subsequently many countries signed commercial treaties and opened consulates. He even introduced a copper coinage to amplify the existing silver coinage of Maria Theresa thalers and Spanish dollars.

Treaty with the United States
On 21 September 1833 a historical treaty of friendship and trade was signed with the United States of America. It was the second trade treaty formulated by the U.S. and an Arab state (Morocco being the first in 1820). The United States and Oman both stood to benefit, as the U.S. – unlike Britain and France – had no territorial ambitions in the Middle East and was solely interested in commerce. On 13 April 1840, the ship Al-Sultanah docked at New York, making it the first Arab envoy to ever visit the New World. Her crew of fifty-six Arab sailors caused a flurry of excitement among the three hundred thousand residents of that thriving metropolis. Al-Sultanah carried ivory, Persian rugs, spices, coffee and dates, as well as lavish gifts for President Martin Van Buren. The visit of Al-Sultanah lasted nearly four months, in which time the emissary, Ahmed Bin Na'aman Al-Kaabi (whose portrait can still be seen in the Oman and Zanzibar display of the Peabody Museum in Massachusetts) and his officers were entertained by state and city dignitaries. They received resolutions passed by official bodies, were given tours of New York City and saw sections which would, a few decades later, become colonies of Arabic-speaking immigrants. Among Bin Na'aman's hosts was Commodore Cornelius Vanderbilt, in whose home he met Governor William H. Seward and Vice President Richard Mentor Johnson. The visit of Ahmed Bin Na'aman to America was a happy one, and when he prepared to leave, the United States completely repaired Al-Sultanah and presented him with gifts for his Sultan.

End of Said's Reign
Said made periodic visits to Muscat, leaving his eldest son Khalid as Governor of Zanzibar in his absence. Khalid had a predilection for French goods and named his principal country estate Marseilles, after the Mediterranean port. When Khalid died of tuberculosis in November 1854, an order came from Said in Muscat appointing another son, the 20-year-old Majid, as governor.

In September 1856, Said sailed for Zanzibar on his ship Kitorie in the company of his nineteen-year-old son, Barghash bin Said. He began to suffer severe pains from an old battle wound in his thigh followed by an attack of dysentery. He died on board the ship on 19 October 1856 at the age of sixty-five.

Division of Zanzibar and Oman
Schisms within the ruling family were apparent after the death of Sultan Said bin Sultan, as his sons who had their own rivalries and ambitions for controlling the throne quarreled over the empire. Realizing that Majid would be unaware of their father's death, Bargash came ashore secretly and tried to take control of the palace at Mtoni and the fort in Zanzibar town, but he was unable to muster enough supporters and his attempt was thwarted.

On 28 October 1856, Majid proclaimed himself Sultan of Zanzibar. A ship was sent to Oman with the news, but Said's elder son Thuwaini, who was appointed heir apparent on 23 July 1844 and had long acted as his father's Governor in Muscat and commander-in-chief of the Saidi forces, refused to acknowledge Majid and immediately tried to regain Zanzibar by force of arms. As a direct result of this struggle, the government of British India, concerned with the stability in the area, acted as arbitrator in the dispute.  The Governor-General of British India, Lord Canning ruled in his arbitration that the empire was to be divided into two separate sultanates: the Sultanate of Zanzibar with its dependencies to Majid bin Said, Said's former Governor of the East African dominions, and the Sultanate of Muscat and Oman to Thuwaini bin Said. On 10 March 1862, the Zanzibar Guarantee Treaty was signed in Paris by Britain and France, whereby both parties agreed to respect the independence of the Sultan of Oman and the Sultan of Zanzibar. Recognizing the economic loss caused to Oman by the severance of the Zanzibar connection, Thuwaini insisted Majid pay 40,000 Maria Theresa thalers annually as compensation but the payment fell into arrears and ceased a year later.

Recent history
State rule shifted consecutively in Zanzibar from the hands of the heirless Majid to three of his brothers until the Zanzibar revolution of 1964, led by the island's black African citizens. The revolutionaries overthrew of the last Sultan of Zanzibar, Jamshid bin Abdullah. Zanzibar became a Marxist republic overnight, the clove industry was nationalised and the Sultan's Hospital was consequently renamed the Vladmir Illych Lenin Hospital (now known by the politically neutral name of the Coconut Palm Infirmary).

Jamshid and his family fled to England in 1964 and settled into exile in a modest home in Portsmouth, England. He was pardoned by Zanzibar President Salmin Amour on the 46th anniversary of the 1964 uprising and declared free to return as an ordinary Zanzibari citizen, but remained barred from settling in Oman until Q4 of 2020 after being exiled for more than 50 years.

In 1868, the royal house in Oman took a brief turn through a distant line of the family when Imam Azzan bin Qais started rebelling against Thuwaini bin Said with the help and encouragement of the Wahhabis in 1864. Azzan eventually managed to expel Thuwaini's eldest son Salim bin Thuwaini, seizing power in October 1868. Under Azzan, the country briefly reverted to being an imamate, rather than a sultanate. Although he was accepted by a significant portion of the Al Hinai tribe, his subsequent attempts to subdue the interior alienated the Ghafiri tribe, who in 1870 instigated a general revolt led by Salim's uncle Sayyid Turki bin Said.

Turki contrived to keep the office within the immediate family and re-establish his father's sultanate; having secured the political and financial backing of the British, he managed to execute Azzan, bringing the revolt to a successful end in January 1871. Succession continued through his great-grandson, Sultan Qaboos bin Said, who rose to power by overthrowing his father, Said bin Taimur, in a palace coup in 1970. Qaboos died on 10 January 2020 after 50 years in power. He was replaced by his cousin, Haitham bin Tariq Al Said, after a letter, written by Qaboos himself, designated Haitham as his chosen successor.

Honorific titles
In Oman, Sayyid is a title used by some members of the House of Busaid. The absolute ruler of the country retains the title Sultan with members of the royal family eligible for succession to the throne given the title Sheikh, and these may also use the title Sayyid should they wish to. However, the title Sheikh supersedes Sayyid, so it is not a widely used practice. Members of the extended family or members by marriage carry the title Sayyid or Sayyida for a female. Such titles are hereditary through paternal lineage or in some exceptional circumstances may be given as an honorary title by royal decree.

List of rulers

Imams of Oman
1744–1778 Imam Ahmed bin Said
1778–1783 Imam Said bin Ahmed

Sultans of Oman
1783–1792 Sultan Hamad bin Said
1792–1804 Sultan Sultan bin Ahmed
1805–1806 Sultan Badr bin Seif
1806–1856 Sultan Said bin Sultan
1856–1866 Sultan Thuwaini bin Said
1866–1868 Sultan Salim bin Thuwaini
1868–1871 Imam Azzan bin Qais
1871–1888 Sultan Turki bin Said
1888–1913 Sultan Faisal bin Turki
1913–1932 Sultan Taimur bin Faisal
1932–1970 Sultan Said bin Taimur
1970–2020 Sultan Qaboos bin Said
2020–present Sultan Haitham bin Tariq

Sultans of Zanzibar
1856–1870 Sultan Majid bin Said
1870–1888 Sultan Barghash bin Said
1888–1890 Sultan Khalifa bin Said
1890–1893 Sultan Ali bin Said
1893–1896 Sultan Hamad bin Thuwaini
26 Aug 1896 Sultan Khalid bin Bargash
1896–1902 Sultan Hamud bin Mohammed
1902–1911 Sultan Ali bin Hamud
1911–1960 Sultan Khalifa bin Harub
1960–1963 Sultan Abdullah bin Khalifa
1963–1964 Sultan Jamshid bin Abdullah

Family Tree

Controversy
There have been reports of activists being jailed for criticism against the Sultan and the government. As Oman is classified as an absolute monarchy, the Sultan wields a great deal of power, and has the authority to grant pardons to those who are jailed.

References

Extended References
Wilkinson, Origins. op. cit. pg. 73.
Public Records Office. London: Foreign Office Archives. (Cited as F.O.) F.O. 93/33/82.

Randall L. Pouwels. Horn and Crescent: Cultural Change and Traditional Islam on the East African.
Peter J. Ochs. Maverick guide to Oman. pg. 110 – 114.
Gabriel Said Reynolds. The Qurʼān in its historical context/Arab Client Tribes. pg. 57–58.
John Townsend. Oman: the making of a modern state.  pg. 43–45.
Chris McIntyre, Susan McIntyre. Zanzibar. pg. 14–15
R. Khanam. Encyclopaedic ethnography of Middle-East and Central Asia: A-I, Volume 1 pg. 68
Ibn Khallikan. Ibn Khallikan's Biographical dictionary.
Universiṭah ha-ʻIvrit bi-Yerushalayim. Makhon le-limude Asyah ṿe-Afriḳah, Ḳeren Maḳs Shlesinger. Jerusalem studies in Arabic and Islam, Volume 28. pg. 234.
Colonel S. B, Miles. The Countries and Tribes of the Persian Gulf.

External links
 BBC, Row over Zanzibar sultan's amnesty, 2000
 The Official Website of the Zanzibar Royal Family

Al Said dynasty
Middle Eastern royal families
Arab dynasties
Omani Ibadi Muslims
Busaid